Doug Crawford (born October 15, 1949) is an American former professional tennis player.

Crawford, a native of Massachusetts, played collegiate tennis for the University of North Carolina at Chapel Hill

Active on the professional tour in the 1970s, Crawford reached a best singles world ranking of 117 and made the third round of the 1977 US Open, with wins over Nikola Špear and Francisco González.

References

External links
 
 

1949 births
Living people
American male tennis players
North Carolina Tar Heels men's tennis players
Tennis players from Boston